Antoni Kazimierz Ostrowski (1713–1784) was a Polish priest and politician. He was bishop of Inflanty (1753–1763), bishop of Kujawy (1763–1776) and archbishop of Gniezno (also, Primate of Poland) (1777–1784). He was one of the Polish nobles in Russian service and supported their position, including presiding over the Partition Sejm in 1773–1775.

He was son of Ludwik Ostrowski and Katarzyna.

External links 
 Archbishop Antoni Kazimierz Ostrowski
 Virtual tour Gniezno Cathedral 
List of Primates of Poland 

1713 births
1784 deaths
Archbishops of Gniezno
Bishops of Kujawy and Włocławek
18th-century Roman Catholic archbishops in the Polish–Lithuanian Commonwealth
Recipients of the Order of the White Eagle (Poland)